The 2009–10 Biathlon World Cup – World Cup 6 was the sixth event of the season and was held in Antholz, Italy from Wednesday, January 20 until Sunday, January 24, 2010.

Schedule of events
The schedule of the event is below

Medal winners

Men

Women

Achievements
 Best performance for all time

 , 1 place in Individual
 , 3 place in Individual
 , 4 place in Individual
 , 11 place in Individual
 , 19 place in Individual and 14 place in Pursuit
 , 28 place in Individual
 , 30 place in Individual
 , 64 place in Individual
 , 77 place in Individual
 , 81 place in Individual
 , 4 place in Sprint
 , 13 place in Sprint
 , 20 place in Sprint
 , 23 place in Sprint
 , 43 place in Sprint and 36 place in Pursuit
 , 59 place in Sprint and 56 place in Pursuit
 , 62 place in Sprint
 , 72 place in Sprint
 , 4 place in Pursuit
 , 26 place in Pursuit
 , 5 place in Individual
 , 18 place in Individual
 , 56 place in Individual
 , 61 place in Individual
 , 71 place in Individual
 , 78 place in Individual and Sprint
 , 82 place in Individual and 77 place in Sprint
 , 85 place in Individual
 , 87 place in Individual
 , 12 place in Sprint
 , 21 place in Sprint and 15 place in Pursuit
 , 88 place in Sprint
 , 19 place in Pursuit

 First World Cup race

 , 25 place in Individual
 , 60 place in Individual
 , 63 place in Individual
 , 70 place in Individual
 , 71 place in Individual
 , 85 place in Individual
 , 100 place in Individual
 , 104 place in Individual
 , 37 place in Individual
 , 62 place in Individual
 , 67place in Individual

References

- World Cup 6, 2009-10 Biathlon World Cup
Biathlon
Biathlon competitions in Italy
2010 in Italian sport